Zolus is a genus of beetles in the family Carabidae. The genus is endemic to New Zealand.

Species in genus 
This genus contains the following species:

 Zolus carinatus (Broun, 1882)
 Zolus helmsi Sharp, 1886
Zolus kauriensis   Larochelle & Larivière, 2017
 Zolus subopacus Broun, 1915
Zolus unisetosus Larochelle & Larivière, 2017
Zolus wongi Larochelle & Larivière, 2017

References

Trechinae